Upepnagssivik is an uninhabited island of the Denmark Strait, Greenland. The island has an area of 149.1 km ² and has a shoreline of 79.1 kilometres.

References

Uninhabited islands of Greenland